The Cherokee One Feather is an English language newspaper in North Carolina published on the Cherokee Indian Reservation in Cherokee, North Carolina. It has been published since at least 1967. Robert Jumper is its editor.

The paper has received awards for its work.

The paper has covered events promoting the tribes' cultural identity.

Margaret Bender wrote about the paper noting its popularity in the community and influential role in North Carolina's Cherokee community.

See also 
 Eastern Band of Cherokee Indians

References

External links 
 

Eastern Band of Cherokee Indians
Native American organizations
Newspapers published in North Carolina
1967 establishments in North Carolina
Newspapers established in 1967